Swaine is both a surname and a given name. Notable people with the name include:

People with the surname
 Aisling Swaine, Irish academic in International Affairs
 Ann Swaine (<1821–1883), British writer and suffragist
 Francis Swaine (1725–1782), British marine painter, father of Monamy
 John Swaine (1775–1860), English engraver
 John Joseph Swaine (1932–2012), President of the Legislative Council of Hong Kong
 Leopold Swaine (1840–1931), British officer
 Michael Swaine (technical author), American author
 Michael D. Swaine, American expert in China security studies
Monamy Swaine (c.1750-c.1800), British artist, son of Francis
 Robert Swaine (d. 1705), first owner of Leverington Hall in Cambridgeshire

People with the given name
 Alfred Swaine Taylor (1806–1880), English toxicologist and medical writer
 Dorothy Swaine Thomas (1899–1977), American sociologist and economist
 Francis Swaine Muhlenberg (1795–1831), German-American politician

See also 
Swain (disambiguation)
Swaine Adeney Brigg

English masculine given names
English-language surnames